The Women's Freestyle 53 kg is a competition featured at the 2020 European Wrestling Championships, and was held in Rome, Italy on February 13 and February 14.

Medalists

Results 
 Legend
 F — Won by fall
WO — Won by walkover

Final

Top half

Bottom half

Repechage

References

External links
Bracket

Women's Freestyle 53 kg
2020 in women's sport wrestling